Listed below are the 2003 UCI Women's Teams that competed in 2003 women's road cycling events organized by the International Cycling Union (UCI).

Teams overview

Source:

Cyclists

Ages as of 1 January 2003.

Source

References

2003
UCI